"Wonderful Life" is a song by the English singer Black from his 1987 album Wonderful Life. The song was released twice as a single and was successful the second time, becoming a top ten hit in Austria, France, Germany, Italy, Switzerland, the Netherlands and the UK. Black, who wrote the song while broke, commented: "I was really being ironic... Most people took it at face value."

Single release
First released in 1986 by Ugly Man Records, it initially peaked at no. 72 on the UK Singles Chart. The label and Vearncombe then decided to re-release the song with a new record company, A&M Records after the success of "Sweetest Smile" and the single reached a higher peak of no. 8 on the chart in August 1987.

Reception
In a contemporary review in Smash Hits, Vici McDonald called it a "wonderful record sentimental without being slushy". She went on: "It's heartening to see someone who a) isn't particularly handsome, b) has a spook-name (i.e. Colin Vearncombe), c) has no discernible 'image' and d) writes slightly odd lyrics, get into the charts purely on the strength of their music, which in this case is very strong indeed."

The song was described by AllMusic as a "seductive, bittersweet ballad". The Daily Telegraph said: "Its oddly uplifting lyrics... combined with Black's melancholy croon created, as one critic observed, 'luxuriantly melodic pop that sounds something like a male version of Sade'."

Music video
The music video, shot in black and white, was filmed around the English seaside resort of Southport, Merseyside, as well as Wallasey near Black's hometown of Liverpool, and features New Brighton Lighthouse and promenade. The video includes the Looping Star rollercoaster, a ride at Pleasureland at the time, as well as The Galleon fairground ride, the shrimping boat, local shops and residents. It was directed by Gerard de Thame, husband of television presenter Rachel de Thame, and won an award at the New York Film Festival in 1988.

Personnel

Musicians

Colin Vearncombe – vocals
Roy Corkill – fretless bass
Jimmy Hughes – drums
Martin Green – saxophone
Dave "Dix" Dickie – keyboards, programming
The Creamy Whirls (Tina Labrinski, Sara Lamarra), Doreen Edwards – backing vocals
Jimmy Sangster – fretted bass
The Sidwell Brothers – brass section

Production
Recorded at Powerplant Studios (London), Square One Studio (Bury) and Pink Studio (Liverpool).

Formats and track listings
7" single
"Wonderful Life" – 4:49
"Life Calls" – 3:51

12" maxi single
"Wonderful Life" – 4:49
"Life Calls" – 3:51
"Had Enough" – 4:58
"All We Need Is the Money" – 4:23

Charts

Weekly charts

Year-end charts

Certifications

Mathilde Santing version

Dutch singer Mathilde Santing recorded her own cover version of "Wonderful Life" on her 1999 album To Others to One. It was released as a maxi single and was used in a television advertisement for Interpolis, a Dutch insurance company, in 2005. In addition to the album To Others to One, it is also on the albums 20 jaar hits 1981–2001 (Muziek 20 Daagse 2001) and 100 Love Songs [2008].

Weekly charts

Year-end charts

Tina Cousins version

British singer Tina Cousins covered "Wonderful" for her second studio album, Mastermind (2005). She recorded it at Charlton Farm Studios in Bath, England. This version, produced by Louie Nicastro and Tom Maddicott, was released in Australia on 30 May 2005 and reached number 17 on the country's ARIA Singles Chart the following month. In the United Kingdom, following a digital release in late November 2005, the cover debuted and peaked at number 58 on the UK Singles Chart on 4 December 2005. The song also charted in Finland, reaching number 17 on the Finnish Singles Chart.

Track listings
UK CD single
"Wonderful Life" (dance radio edit)
"Wonderful Life" (ballad version)
"Wonderful Life" (extended mix)
"Wonderful Life" (Kenny Hayes Sunshine Funk remix)
"Wonderful Life" (Lee S remix)
"Wonderful Life" (Low Frequency Occupation club mix)

UK digital download
"Wonderful Life" (dance radio edit) – 3:53
"Wonderful Life" (extended mix) – 8:18
"Wonderful Life" (Kenny Hayes Sunshine Funk remix) – 6:25
"Wonderful Life" (Lee S remix) – 6:20
"Wonderful Life" (ballad version) – 3:20
"Wonderful Life" (Low Frequency Occupation club mix) – 7:18

Australian and New Zealand maxi-CD single
"Wonderful Life" (dance version) – 3:53
"Wonderful Life" (ballad version) – 3:20
"Wonderful Life" (Low Frequency Occupation radio edit) – 3:50
"Wonderful Life" (Low Frequency Occupation club mix) – 7:18
"Wonderful Life" (Methods of Flow club mix) – 6:12
"Wonderful Life" (Low Frequency Occupation Dubful Life) – 6:36

Credits and personnel
Credits are lifted from the UK CD single liner notes.

Studio
Recorded at Charlton Farm Studios (Bath, Somerset, England)

Personnel
Colin Vearncombe – writing
Louie Nicastro, Tom Maddicott – production
Sil Wilcox – worldwide representation
PixelFrame.com.au – cover design

Charts

Weekly charts

Year-end charts

Release history

Other cover versions
In 2011, the song featured on the Christmas album Funny Looking Angels by Smith & Burrows, a collaboration between Tom Smith (Editors) and Andy Burrows (We Are Scientists and ex-Razorlight). A version by Katie Melua was originally included on the BBC Radio 2's Sounds of the 80s compilation album, and was subsequently released as a single in aid of Great Ormond Street Hospital and The Children's Hospital Charity.

Use in the media
The song was used in TV advertisements for Fleury Michon meat products in France in the 2000s, but was not sung by Black.
In 2008/2009 it was used by Emirates Airlines to promote air travel to Dubai.
In 2015 it was covered by Katie Melua for Premier Inn's £25 million TV advertising campaign.

References

External links
"Wonderful Life" – lyrics
"Wonderful Life" page, with video, at wonderfullife.info

1986 songs
1986 singles
1987 singles
1994 singles
1999 singles
2001 singles
2005 singles
A&M Records singles
Black (singer) songs
Black-and-white music videos
Kate Ryan songs
Katie Melua songs
Number-one singles in Austria
Number-one singles in Poland
Pop ballads
Songs about loneliness
Tina Cousins songs
Zucchero Fornaciari songs
1980s ballads